In the Imperial Russian Army, a military district (voyenny okrug) was a territorial association of military units, formations, military schools, and various local military establishments.  This territorial division type was utilized to provide a more efficient management of army units, their training and other operations activities related to combat readiness.

History

In the Imperial Russian Army, military districts were first formed by Dmitry Milyutin in 1862–64 to replace the pre-existing Military Inspectorates. The military districts were organised to include civilian administration regions of gubernyas and uyezds. By 1892 there were 13 Military Districts in the Russian Empire, and one region with the status of a military district:

 Petersburg Military District – Saint Petersburg, Olonets, Arkhangelsk, Novgorod, Pskov, Estonia and four uyezds of the Livonia gubernya (Pernov, Fellinskiy, Valkskiy and Verrosskiy)
 Vilno Military District – Vilno, Grodno, Kovno, Kurland, Livonia (without above mentioned four uyezds), Vitebsk, Mogilev, Minsk and Suwałki (without the Shchuchinsk uyezd)
 Warsaw Military District – Congress Poland without the part of Suwałki in Vilno Military District
 Kiev Military District  – Kiev, Podolia, Volhynia, Chernigov, Poltava, Kharkov, Kursk
 Odessa Military District – Bessarabia, Kherson, Yekaterinoslav, Taurida
 Moscow Military District – Moscow, Smolensk, Tver, Yaroslavl, Kostroma, Vologda, Vladimir, Nizhniy-Novgorod, Kaluga, Tula, Ryazan, Orel, Tambov, Voronezh
 Kazan Military District – Kazan, Vyatka, Perm, Ufa, Simbirsk, Samara, Penza, Saratov, Astrakhan (with the  Astrakhan, Ural and Orenburg Cossack host troops)
 Caucasus Military District – Stavropol gubernya with the entire Caucasus and Transcaucasia (including the Kuban and Terek Cossack host troops)
 Turkestan Military District – the region (область): Syr-Darya (with the Amu Dar'ya subdivision), Samarkand and Fergana
 Omsk Military District – Tobolsk and Tomsk guberniyas, the Akmolinsk, Semipalatinsk and Semirechye regions (with the local Cossack troops).
 Irkutsk Military District – Irkutsk and Yeniseysk Governorates and the Yakutsk region (with the local Cossack troops).
 Amur Military District – regions of Transbaikal, Amur (with the local Cossack troops), Pacific coast region and the Sakhalin island
 Don Host Oblast, In the Donskoy military district the right and responsibility of the Commander of forces and Governor-Generalship were entrusted to the appointed ataman; control of the military district consisted of Don Cossack host staff and administration.

During World War I the remnants of occupied Vilno Military District were organized into two districts: Dvina and Minsk.

The Commander of the military district was named Commanding troops of (name) military district (in the Petersburg military district – Commander-in-Chief who was the Tsar), with all troops, military institutions and military ranks of the military region subordinated to them.

In some regions the military district commander was simultaneously the local Governor-General.

Control of military district included the military-district council and functional district staff and the administrations of artillery, engineers, commissariat and military medical service.

However by the beginning of the First World War there were 12 military districts remaining: Dvinsk, Irkutsk, Caucasus, Kazan, Kiev, Minsk, Moscow, Odessa, Omsk, Petrograd, Amur and Turkestan.

Former districts
 Finland Military District – included all eight Provinces of the Grand Duchy of Finland (1864-1905). It was merged into the Petersburg Military District in 1905.
 Kharkov Military District (1864–1888)
 Riga Military District (1864–1870)
 Orenburg Military District (1865–1881)
 West Siberian Military District (1822–1882)
 East Siberian Military District (1865–1884)
 Siberian Military District (1899–1906)
 Transcaspian Oblast in (1890–1899)
 Trans Amur District of Separate Border Guard Corps in (1901–1914)

 
Subdivisions of the Russian Empire
Russian and Soviet military-related lists

ru:Военный округ